Korthalsia minor is an Asian species of rattan plant in the family Arecaceae and the tribe Calameae.  It has been recorded from Laos and Vietnam.  The type locality is Cát Tiên National Park (altitude approx. 150 m) in Đồng Nai Province.

References

External Links 
 

 Calamoideae
Flora of Indo-China